One Way Pendulum is a 1965 British comedy film directed by Peter Yates and starring Eric Sykes and George Cole. It is an adaptation of the play by N. F. Simpson.

Plot
Study of absurdity in a suburban family: father rebuilds the Old Bailey in the living room, and the son teaches weighing machines to sing in the attic.

Cast
 Eric Sykes as Mr. Groomkirby
 George Cole as Defence counsel / friend
 Julia Foster as Sylvia
 Jonathan Miller as Kirby
 Peggy Mount as Mrs. Mara Gantry
 Alison Leggatt as Mrs. Groomkirby 
 Mona Washbourne as Aunt Mildred 
 Douglas Wilmer as Judge / Maintenance Man 
 Glyn Houston as Detective Inspector Barnes 
 Graham Crowden as Prosecuting Counsel / Caretaker  
 Ken Farrington as Stan 
 Walter Horsbrugh as Clerk of the Court / Drycleaner's Assistant 
 Frederick Piper as Usher / Office Clerk 
 Vincent Harding as Policeman / Bus Conductor
 Trevor Bannister as Groomkirby's colleague (uncredited)
 Tommy Bruce as Gormless (the voice of the 'Speak your Weight' machine).

Production
Producer Michael Deeley and director Peter Yates wanted to work on a project together and saw the play at the Royal Court Theatre. Yates was excited at the prospect of the material being so different from his first feature, Summer Holiday (1963), and Deeley managed to set up the film at Woodfall Film Productions, then flush with money in the wake of the success of Tom Jones (1963). Writer John Osborne helped introduce Yates and Simpson to United Artists.

Simpson said he had received a number of offers to film the play but turned them down because he did not feel it was a movie. He changed his mind after a meeting with Yates where the director said the words were key to visual concepts. "He was the first film man I met I felt I could work with," said Simpson who wrote the script and was on set every day.

The film was the first from Woodfall to be shot in a studio and commenced filming at Twickenham Studios in March 1964. A collection of location stills and corresponding contemporary photographs is hosted at reelstreets.com.

Reception
The film was poorly received by the public and did not recoup its money. However Woodfall Films was impressed by Michael Deeley and hired him to work for the company.

The film received a poor review in the New York Times from critic Howard Thompson, who wrote that it was "a new serving of British-stirred froth that weighs almost as much as Big Ben. And how it got those friendly notices back in the homeland, we'll never know. The picture is excruciatingly coy and flat, coming, believe it or not, from the Woodfall production unit that gave us, among other things, 'Tom Jones'."

References

External links

1965 films
1965 comedy films
1960s satirical films
British black-and-white films
British comedy films
British films based on plays
British satirical films
Films about dysfunctional families
Films directed by Peter Yates
Films scored by Richard Rodney Bennett
United Artists films
Films set in London
1960s English-language films
1960s British films